Electric Peak is a  mountain summit located in San Juan County, Colorado, United States. It is situated eight miles south of the community of Silverton, in the Weminuche Wilderness, on land managed by San Juan National Forest. It is part of the Needle Mountains which are a subset of the San Juan Mountains, which in turn is a subset of the Rocky Mountains. Precipitation runoff from the mountain drains into tributaries of the Animas River. The peak can be seen from U.S. Route 550 and the Durango and Silverton Narrow Gauge Railroad. It is set five miles west of the Continental Divide, and one mile east of Mount Garfield. The mountain's name, which has been officially adopted by the United States Board on Geographic Names, was in use before 1906 when Henry Gannett published it in the Gazetteer of Colorado.

Climate 
According to the Köppen climate classification system, Electric Peak is located in an alpine subarctic climate zone with very long, cold, snowy winters, and cool to warm summers. Due to its altitude, it receives precipitation all year, as snow in winter, and as thunderstorms in summer, with a dry period in late spring.

Geology 
The formation dates to the Statherian period and is interpreted as metamorphosed marine and fluvial sandstone, mudstone, and shale. The formation overlies plutons with an age of 1,707 million years.

Gallery

References

External links 

 Weather forecast: Electric Peak

Mountains of San Juan County, Colorado
San Juan Mountains (Colorado)
Mountains of Colorado
North American 4000 m summits
San Juan National Forest